The 2007–08 season of Crewe Alexandra Football Club's 84th competitive season. They competed in Football League One.

Events

This is a list of the significant events to occur at the club during the 2007–08 season, presented in chronological order. This list does not include transfers (which are listed in the transfers section below), match results (which are in the matches section) or awards (which are in the awards section).

2007
20 April: Dario Gradi announces that as from 1 July, would take up a new role as the club's Technical Director whilst gradually allowing first-team coach Steve Holland control of the team.
18 June: Crewe win the Bobby Moore Fair Play award for their outstanding conduct and discipline throughout the 2006/07 season.
11 August: The opening day of the season sees young striker Nicky Maynard fracture his fibula. He was diagnosed to be out for 3–4 months. Maynard returned as a 46th-minute substitute 112 days later in the FA Cup.11 August: Crewe end the day top of the league after their 2–1 win over Brighton and Hove Albion.
15 August: Crewe are eliminated from the Carling Cup by Championship side Hull City after a 3–0 loss at home.
25 August: Crewe drop out of the play-off zone after a 2–0 loss to Leyton Orient.
4 September: Crewe are eliminated from the Johnstone's Paint Trophy by Cheshire-neighbours Chester City after a penalty shootout defeat in the First round
1 December: Crewe are eliminated from the FA Cup by League One side Oldham Athletic away from home. This result means that Crewe are eliminated from all cup competitions for the 2007–08 season.
3 December: Sky Sports confirm that Crewe's home tie with Leeds United will be shown live on TV. The kickoff was changed to 19:45 GMT on Monday 14 January 2008. Crewe lost the match 1–0.

2008
29 January: Crewe enter the relegation zone in League One after a 1–1 draw with Bristol Rovers.
9 February: Crewe climb out the relegation zone to 20th after a 2–2 draw with top-of-the-table Swansea City.
26 March: Michael O'Connor makes his senior international debut for Northern Ireland in a 4–1 win against Georgia.

Players

Squad information

Appearances (starts and substitute appearances) and goals include those in the League One (and playoffs), FA Cup, League Cup and Football League Trophy.

Squad stats

Disciplinary record

Crewe currently have the best disciplinary record in The Football League

Awards

Individual

Club

Players in / out

In

Out

 Initial fee of £500,000, plus clauses:
£62,500 for 15, 30 and 45 appearances for Preston North End
20% sell-on clause
£250,000 should Jones achieve promotion whilst at Preston North End.

Club

Coaching staff

Other information

Kits

Competitions

Overall

League One

Table

Results summary

Results by round

Matches

FA Cup

League Cup

Football League Trophy

Trivia
Gillingham's Chris Dickson scored the winning goal against Crewe on 5 December at Gresty Road after spending one month on loan for the Railwaymen.
Walsall's goalkeeper Clayton Ince received the November Powerade Player of the Month award just four days before playing against his former club. Ince, who spent six years at Crewe, said of the occasion, "...my feelings for the club will be put to one side for 90 minutes on Saturday." Ince kept a clean sheet in the match which resulted in a 0–0 draw.
On 12 February, Crewe signed Ipswich Town midfielder Gary Roberts. Unusually, he is the second player with the name Gary Roberts at Crewe. He was assigned the shirt number 32, whilst the other Gary Roberts has the number 4 shirt.
Ex-Crewe striker Luke Rodgers scored the final goal in the local derby against Port Vale, just as he did last season.

References

External links
Official Website
Sky Sports
BBC Football

Crewe Alexandra F.C. seasons
Crewe Alexandra